Superb Internet Technologies is a web hosting and Internet domain registrar company in business since 1996. According to Netcraft's January 2008 statistics, Superb Internet hosts over 340,000 unique sites, making it one of the world's 60 largest web hosts. Services offered by Superb Internet include basic web hosting, dedicated hosting, VPS hosting, as well as reseller hosting.
Superb Internet is led by CEO Jeremy Gulban, and is currently a private company. Superb Internet's corporate offices are located in Honolulu, Hawaii, and with data centers located coast-to-coast in the United States in McLean, Virginia and South Seattle, Washington.  Purchase of HopOne Internet and Superb Internet was completed by CherryRoad Technologies in May 2019.

References

External links
Dedicated Web Hosting Company

Web hosting
Internet mirror services